TWA Flight 6 was a Transcontinental & Western Air Douglas DC-2, on a route from Los Angeles to Newark, New Jersey, that crashed near Atlanta, Missouri, on May 6, 1935, killing five of the thirteen people on board, including Senator Bronson M. Cutting of New Mexico. The airliner crashed when its wingtip hit the ground as it flew under a low cloud ceiling at very low level, over dark, fog-shrouded country, while its pilots were trying desperately to reach a nearby emergency landing field before their fuel ran out. 

Investigators from the Bureau of Air Commerce concluded that several factors had led up to this crisis, including communications malfunctions, darkness, inaccurate weather forecasts, worsening weather at the destination airport, and errors in judgment both from the airline dispatchers and the flight crew; they also found TWA in violation of several aviation regulations. Senator Cutting's death drove Congress to look into the Bureau's own management of civil aviation. Senator Royal S. Copeland established a special subcommittee, the Copeland Committee, which held hearings that harshly criticized the Bureau and released a controversial preliminary report that blamed the Bureau's management for the accident. This political battle played a major role in the Bureau of Air Commerce being replaced in 1938 by the newly formed Civil Aeronautics Authority.

References

Bibliography

Further reading
 
 
  (Includes, in addition to the Bureau's accident report, a public statement on the accident by the Secretary of Commerce and two related memoranda by the Director of Air Commerce.)

External links
 Aviation Safety network report
 Bureau of Air Commerce documents:
 1935-05-06 (PDF) - Statement by Secretary Roper
 1935-05-06 (PDF) - Memorandum of the Secretary 
 1935-05-06 (PDF) - Statement of Probable Cause

Airliner accidents and incidents in Missouri
Aviation accidents and incidents in the United States in 1935
6
Accidents and incidents involving the Douglas DC-2
Macon County, Missouri
1935 in Missouri